= Spot delivery =

Delivery of a vehicle to a buyer prior to completed financing

Spot delivery (or spot financing) is a term used in the automobile industry that means delivering a vehicle to a buyer prior to financing on the vehicle being completed. Spot delivery is used by dealerships on the weekend or after bank hours to be able to deliver a vehicle when a final approval cannot be received from a bank. This method of delivery is regulated by many states in the U.S., and is sometimes referred to as a "Yo-Yo sale" or "Yo-Yo Financing."

During a spot delivery, many consumers believe that the deal is final when in fact it is not. Signed agreements allow the dealership the right to take the car back or renegotiate the agreement if it cannot obtain financing within a specific amount of time.
